John Bizon (born September 1, 1951) is an American politician and physician who served as a member of the Michigan Senate for the 19th district. Elected in November 2018, he assumed office on January 1, 2019 and served until December 31, 2022.

Early life and education
John Bizon was born in Detroit on September 1, 1951 and raised in Allen Park, Michigan. He attended St. Frances Cabrini Elementary and was an Altar Boy.  He earned a Bachelor of Science from Michigan State University and a medical degree from Wayne State University School of Medicine.

Career

Military service
After graduating from the Air Force's Flight Surgeon's school, Air Force pilots became Bizon's primary patients. His military career included stations in at Lackland Air Force Base, the Upper Peninsula at K-I Sawyer Air Force Base, and the Clark Air Base in the Philippines, where Bizon took care of combat pilots, servicemen and women and civilians during the Vietnam War. After leaving South East Asia, Bizon became a lieutenant colonel and ended his Air Force career serving in Michigan at K. I. Sawyer.

Medicine
After serving 11 years in the Air Force, Bizon was asked by fellow otolaryngologist Joe Schwarz to take up his practice in Battle Creek, Michigan. Schwarz had just been elected to the Michigan Senate himself and went on to become the United States House of Representatives for Michigan's 7th congressional district.

Politics
Bizon was first elected to represent Michigan's 62nd District in the Michigan House of Representatives in 2014, defeating Andy Helmboldt, following the departure of Kate Segal who had reached her term limit. In November 2016 Bizon was reelected to his second term, defeating then commissioner Jim Haadsma and the Libertarian candidate.

In the 2018 election cycle he ran for Michigan's 19th Senate District, first beating former Representative Mike Callton in a high caliber and expensive primary before being elected in the November general election after defeating the Democratic Party candidate.

Prior to seeking public office Dr. Bizon was the President of the Michigan State Medical Society. He has also been a longtime member of the Calhoun County Republican Party and the Calhoun County TEA Party Patriots.

Sexual assault charges

Sen. John Bizon pleaded guilty to a misdemeanor assault and battery charge on Thursday Feb. 17, 2022 in Calhoun County's 10th District Court.

Electoral history

References

External links
 Campaign website

Living people
People from Battle Creek, Michigan
Michigan State University alumni
Wayne State University School of Medicine alumni
Republican Party members of the Michigan House of Representatives
United States Air Force officers
21st-century American politicians
People from Allen Park, Michigan
Military personnel from Michigan
1951 births